Gordon Raymond Wallace (27 January 1929 – 26 November 2015) was a Canadian professional middle/light heavyweight boxer of the 1950s who won the British Empire light heavyweight title, and was a challenger for the Canada light heavyweight title on four occasions against Yvon Durelle, his professional fighting weight varied from , i.e. middleweight to , i.e. light heavyweight.

References

External links

Image - Gordon Wallace
Image - Gordon Wallace

1929 births
Light-heavyweight boxers
2015 deaths
Middleweight boxers
Sportspeople from Greater Sudbury
Boxing people from Ontario
Canadian male boxers